The JAL Super Hayago Championship is a Nihon-Kiin Go competition. This tournament was created after the Hayago Championship and Kakusei titles were merged. The winner's purse is 5,000,000 Yen (US$47,000).

Past winners

References

External links

Go competitions in Japan